Áslaug Jónsdóttir (born 31 March 1963) is an Icelandic writer of children's books, illustrator and playwright.

Early life and education
She grew up near Borgarfjörður in west Iceland and then attended Menntaskólinn við Hamrahlíð in Reykjavik. She then studied in Copenhagen, Denmark at Skolen for Brugskunst (later the  School of Design of the Royal Danish Academy of Fine Arts).

Career
She published her first children's picture book in 1990. Her recent work includes collaboration with two other authors Swedish Kalle Guettler and Faroese Rakel Heimisdal on a series of six "Monsters" books published in Icelandic, Swedish and Faroese, starting with Nei! sagði litla skrímslið (No! Said Little Monster) in 2004.

In 2002 she and Andri Snær Magnason collaborated on Sagan af bláa hnettinum which won the West-Nordic Children's Literature Prize. It has since been translated and published in English (The Story of the Blue Planet, 2013,), Danish, Faroese, German, Italian, Korean and Polish.

See also 

 List of Icelandic writers
 Icelandic literature

References

External links

1963 births
Living people
Royal Danish Academy of Fine Arts alumni
Aslaug Jonsdottir
Aslaug Jonsdottir
Icelandic women children's writers
Aslaug Jonsdottir
Icelandic dramatists and playwrights